The Jefferson Avenue Historic District is a historic district in Downtown Columbus, Ohio. The site was listed on the National Register of Historic Places in 1982 and the Columbus Register of Historic Properties in 1983. The site includes approximately 12 buildings regarded for their history and architecture. It is one of few remaining residential neighborhoods downtown. It includes the Thurber House, formerly home to cartoonist and author James Thurber, and the headquarters building of the Columbus Landmarks Foundation. The boundaries of the district vary slightly between the two registers the district was entered in.

See also
 National Register of Historic Places listings in Columbus, Ohio

References

External links
 

National Register of Historic Places in Columbus, Ohio
Historic districts on the National Register of Historic Places in Ohio
1983 establishments in Ohio
Columbus Register properties
Buildings in downtown Columbus, Ohio
Historic districts in Columbus, Ohio